The following highways are numbered 676:

Philippines
 N676 highway (Philippines)

United States